The Timeline of the oil and gas industry in the United Kingdom is a selection of significant events in the history of the oil and gas sector in the United Kingdom.

References

Petroleum industry in the United Kingdom
Natural gas industry in the United Kingdom
Contemporary history timelines